John W. Hasper (November 6, 1935 – January 4, 2020) was an American politician who served in the New York State Assembly from the 136th district from 1987 to 1992.

He died on January 4, 2020, in Punta Gorda, Florida at age 84.

References

1935 births
2020 deaths
Republican Party members of the New York State Assembly